Pudukkottai is a village in the Ariyalur taluk of Ariyalur district, Tamil Nadu, India. The village has a population of 1856 in 2001 making it smallest settlement in Ariyalur. The Village is close to the Tiruchirapplli District and Thanjavur District border and is within a short distance of locations such as Tiruchirappalli, the Ariyalur and Thanjavur.

Pudukkottai Village is administered by a Village Panchayat established in 1947. Pudukkottai Village comes under the Ariyalur assembly constituency which elects a member to the Tamil Nadu Legislative Assembly once every five years and it is a part of the Chidambaram constituency which elects its Member of Parliament (MP) once in five years. Roadways are the major mode of transportation to the village.

Pudukkottai Village's local weekly newspaper is the Puthiya Thalaimurai, Ananda Vikatan and few more. The village is also served by Tiruchirappalli's daily Tamil newspapers,  Dinathanthi, Dinamalar, Dinakaran, Dinamani and daily English news papers The Hindu, Indian Express.

Pudukkottai Village is most popular for Christianity among the rounded villages where three Christian churches were constructed by various ministries such as Church of South Indian, Roman Catholic and Tamil Nadu Evangelical Lutheran Church. Here a beautiful temple also been constructed by Tamil Hindu People.

The village is a part of the fertile Cauvery Delta and the major profession of the village is Agriculture and Fish farming. Rice, Sugarcane, Vegetables, Dhal and Fruits are the main outsource of the agriculture fields in Pudukkottai Village

History
In 1741 the Maratha invaded Tiruchirappalli and took Chanda Saheb as captive. Chanda Saheb succeeded in securing freedom in 1748 and soon got involved in famous war for the Nawabs place in the Carnatic against Anwardeen, the Nawab of Arcot and his son Mohammed Ali.

Mohammed Ali annexed the two palayams of Ariyalur and Udayarpalayam located with troops were in the Ariyalur district on the grounds of default in payment of Tributes and failure to assist him in quelling the rebellion of Yusuf Khan. In November 1764, Mohammed Ali represented the issue to Madras Council and obtained military assistance on 3 January 1765. The forces led by Umdat-Ul-Umara and Donald Campbell entered Ariyalur and captured it. The young Poligar together with his followers there upon fled to Udayarpalayam. On 19 January the army marched upon Udayarpalayam. The Poligar’s troops were defeated and the palayams were occupied. The two poligars fled their town and took refuge in Tharangampadi, then a Danish Settlement. The annexation of the palayam gave the Navab un-interrupted possession of all his territories extending Arcot to Tiruchirapalli.

The history followed was a power struggle between Hyder Ali and later Tipu Sultan with the British. After the death of Tipu Sultan the English took the civil and military Administration of the Carnatic in 1801. Thus Tiruchirappalli came into the hands of the English and the District was formed in 1801.

In 1871 the Protestant church was constructed at middle of the village by English missionaries. The missionaries made Pudukkottai Village as a spiritual Headquarters of ariyalur region. The presbyter of Pudukkottai pastorate ruled the churches in ariyalur, Jayamkondam and Viragalur.

In 1936 a Roman Catholic church was constructed by RC Mission at east side of the village.

In 1947 the village came under Tiruchirappalli District of freedom India and the Protestant administrative power taken by Church of South India, Trichy Tanjore Diocese.

Recently TELC Mission Church also constructed at west side of village.

Geography
Pudukkottai Village is a Village Panchayat in Ariyalur District in the state of Tamil Nadu. It is located in the bank of coleroon River.

Schools

In Pudukkottai Village, there are two schools
Union Christian Middle School
St.Mary's Primary School

 Union Christian School is maintained by Church of South India, Trichy Tanjore Diocese and St.Mary's Primary School is maintained by Roman Catholics, Kumbakonam Diocese

Hospitals

RC Nursing Home is maintained by Roman Catholics, Kumbakonam Diocese

Hostel

CSI Rainbow Free Hostel 
This Hostel is maintained by Church of South India, Trichy Tanjore Diocese. This hostel is only for 6 year to 13 year boys and girls. The hostel provides a free meal, notes, books required for their schooling.
RC Free Hostel
This Hostel is maintained by Roman Catholic Mission. This hostel is only for 6 year to 10 year boys and girls. They may provide a free meal, notes, books required for their schooling.

Demographics

As per the 2001 census, Pudukkottai had a total population of 1858 with 895 males and 963 females.

References

Villages in Ariyalur district